Anton Kavalevski ((Anton Kovalevskiy); born 2 February 1986) is a Belarusian former professional footballer.

Honours
Naftan Novopolotsk
Belarusian Cup winner: 2008–09

External links
 
 

1986 births
Living people
Sportspeople from Magdeburg
Belarusian footballers
Association football goalkeepers
FC Naftan Novopolotsk players
FC Partizan Minsk players
FC Vitebsk players
FC Belshina Bobruisk players
FC Torpedo-BelAZ Zhodino players
FC Dnepr Mogilev players
FC Isloch Minsk Raion players
Footballers from Saxony-Anhalt